= Uchi-Uke =

Karate defense technique

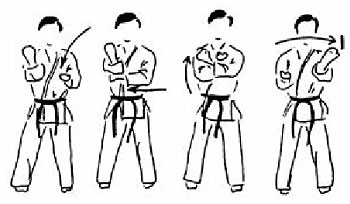
- The movement sequence of Uchi-Uke

Japanese name
- Kanji: 内 腕 受 け
Transcriptions
- Revised Hepburn: Uchi-Uke

The Uchi-Uke (or Uchi-Ude-Uke, Japanese 内 腕 受 け) refers in Karate a defense technique with the forearm for the middle part of the body (Chūdan). Uchi (内) stands for "inside", building (腕) for "arm", uke (受 け) for "defense".
